Naby-Moussa Yattara (born 12 January 1984) is a Guinean professional footballer who plays as a goalkeeper for Championnat National 3 club Stade Beaucairois and the Guinea national team.

International career
Yattara was member of the Guinea national team at the 2008 Africa Cup of Nations in Ghana. His debut was in October 2007 in a 3–1 defeat against Senegal in Rouen.

Career statistics

International

References

External links

Naby Yattara's MTN Statistics

1984 births
Living people
Sportspeople from Conakry
Association football goalkeepers
Guinean footballers
Guinea international footballers
Royal Antwerp F.C. players
FC Sète 34 players
Athlético de Coléah players
ES Paulhan-Pézenas players
AS Excelsior players
Stade Beaucairois players
Championnat National players
Ligue 1 players
Ligue 2 players
Championnat National 3 players
Championnat National 2 players
2008 Africa Cup of Nations players
2012 Africa Cup of Nations players
2015 Africa Cup of Nations players
2019 Africa Cup of Nations players
Guinean expatriate footballers
Expatriate footballers in Belgium
Expatriate footballers in France